The Tarna Mare is a right tributary of the river Bătarci in Romania. It flows into the Bătarci near Șirlău.

References

Rivers of Romania
Rivers of Satu Mare County